Galala is a music genre and dance form popular in Lagos, Nigeria developed by local reggae musicians.

References

African dances
Culture in Lagos